The 1979 Penn State Nittany Lions football team represented the Pennsylvania State University in the 1979 NCAA Division I-A football season. The team was coached by Joe Paterno and played its home games in Beaver Stadium in University Park, Pennsylvania.

Schedule

Roster

Season summary

Rutgers

Texas A&M

at Nebraska

at Maryland

Army

Homecoming
Matt Suhey – 4th highest single game rushing total in school history, broke school record for career rushing attempts, moved into 4th place on all-time school rushing list
Booker Moore – 24 rushes, 103 yards

vs. Syracuse

West Virginia

Miami (FL)

at NC State

Temple

Pittsburgh

Liberty Bowl (vs. Tulane)

Post season

NFL Draft
Seven Nittany Lions were drafted in the 1980 NFL Draft.

References

Penn State
Penn State Nittany Lions football seasons
Liberty Bowl champion seasons
Penn State Nittany Lions football